Water dragon may refer to:

Sea serpent, a type of sea monster that is sometimes known as the Water Dragon
Water dragon, animal species in the genus Physignathus
Australian water dragon, Physignathus lesueurii
Chinese water dragon, Physignathus cocincinus
Saururus cernuus, plant species also known as water-dragon 
The Year of the Water Dragon in the Chinese Sexagenary cycle

Animal common name disambiguation pages